The following people are notable alumni of New York City's Fiorello H. LaGuardia High School (LaG) and its two legacy schools, The High School of Music & Art (MA), and High School of Performing Arts (PA).

Actors

Architects

Artists

Classical Instrumentalists

Classical Singers

Composers

Conductors

Dancers/Choreographers

Designers

Directors/Writers

Entertainers

Jazz Musicians

Lyricists

Media

Photographers

Producers

Singer/Songwriters

See also

 List of people from New York City

References

External links
LaGuardia Arts Alumni at LaGuardia High School official website
Notable Alumni at Alumni and Friends of LaGuardia High School official website

Lists of people by school affiliation in New York (state)
Manhattan-related lists